The Pan American Road and Track Championships are the continental cycling championships for road bicycle racing and track cycling held annually for member nations of the Pan American Cycling Confederation.  Riders competing in the Pan American Cycling Championships are selected by the national governing body.

Men's road events

Road race

Individual time trial

Women's road events

Road race

Individual time trial

Men's track events

Sprint

1 km Time Trial

Keirin

Scratch

Points Race

4km Pursuit

Madison

Omnium

Team Sprint

Team Pursuit

Women's track events

Sprint

500m time trial

Keirin

3km Individual Pursuit

Points Race

Scratch

Omnium

Team Sprint

Team Pursuit

Madison

References 

 
Road bicycle races
Track cycling races
Road and Track Championships
Cycle racing in North America
Cycle racing in South America
Recurring sporting events established in 2001